Bharat Heavy Electricals Limited, Jhansi is a factory and township in Uttar Pradesh, India. It was founded on 9 January 1974 and is one of the 17 manufacturing units of the Bharat Heavy Electricals Limited (BHEL) Corporation. It is located on NH-26, 15 km south of Jhansi city.
 
BHEL Jhansi started production of transformers in 1976. BHEL Jhansi has two product groups: transformers and locomotives. Marketing of products and services is done at the corporate level by Power sector, Industry sector, International operation division and regional office divisions spread all over India.

BHEL Jhansi has received the CII Exim bank award of  "Strong Commitment to Excel" in the year 2007 in the field of Business 
Excellence.

Organisation 
The BHEL Jhansi unit is led by the executive director, Shri Vinay Nigam, who reports to the chairman and managing director. The organisation is governed by corporate policies including human resources, procurement and finance. The operations of BHEL Jhansi are monitored by the BHEL corporate management committee.

Products 

 Transformers − Power Transformers up to 400 kV class/Traction trfr/ESP trfr./Special trfr/Dry TypeTrfr./Inst trfr up to 400 kV class and voltage transformer and current transformers are also produced.
 Locomotives − WAG 7 AC locomotive for Indian railway/diesel locos. all application 3300 hp/wagons up to 300 MT 27 axle/railway track equipment/metro for kolkatta/emu coaches.

Workforce 
BHEL Jhansi has a committed workforce of 1929 employees. All employees have technical 
and professional background to suit the operations. Skilled and experienced manpower is major strength of organisation along with engineering and R&D strength. It also has around 1200 contract workers to cater to the support services.

Workers have recognised union and supervisors have their registered association. To safeguard 
interest of SCs/STs, a registered SC/ST association is in place.

Certifications and recognition 
BHEL Jhansi has been certified for ISO 9001:2001 for Quality Assurance.

External links 
 Official website of BHEL Jhansi
 Official website of BHEL
Old Bhel Jhansi Website

References 

Buildings and structures in Jhansi
Manufacturing plants in Uttar Pradesh
1974 establishments in Uttar Pradesh
Economy of Uttar Pradesh